Dysoxylum macrocarpum is a tree in the family Meliaceae. The specific epithet  is from the Greek meaning "large fruit".

Description
The bark is grey-green. The flowers are creamy-white to orangeish.

Distribution and habitat
Dysoxylum macrocarpum is found in Thailand and Malesia. Its habitat is forests from sea-level to  altitude.

References

macrocarpum
Trees of Thailand
Trees of Malesia
Plants described in 1825